Alfred Lawrence may refer to:

 Alfred Oscar Lawrence (1904–1986), Victorian forester and community leader
 Alfred Lawrence, 1st Baron Trevethin (1843–1936), British lawyer and judge
 Alfred Clive Lawrence (1876–1926), cBritish barrister